Scrobipalpa griseofusella is a moth in the family Gelechiidae. It was described by Toll in 1947. It is found in northern Iran.

The forewings are dark grey-brown, with three black dots, partly surrounded by brownish. The hindwings are dirty grey-whitish.

References

Scrobipalpa
Moths described in 1947